Zainulabedin Hamdulay (born 15 January 1970) is an Indian cardiac surgeon. He is the joint secretary and treasurer at Indian Association of Cardiovascular (IACTS). He is the director of cardiothoracic and vascular surgery at Global Hospital, Parel, Mumbai. He is also a Founder of Hamdulay Heart Foundation. Hamdulay has attended over 7,000 cardiac surgeries.

Early life 
Zainulabedin Hamdulay was born in Shirshee In Khed Taluka Dist. Ratnagiri, Maharashtra. His primary school education was at St. Joseph High School in Solapur. He joined D.B.F Dayanand College of Arts and Science for his Bachelor's degree in Science. He completed his MBBS in 1992. And then further went on to complete his M.S. in 1996. He completed his M.Ch Cardiovascular and thoracic surgery from the University of Mumbai. Hamdulay is the alumni of Sion Hospital and also has studied and trained in cardiac surgery at Toronto General Hospital, Toronto, Canada; Manchester Royal Infirmary, Manchester, UK and Royal Liverpool Children's Hospital, Liverpool, UK.

Career 
Dr. Zainulabedin Hamdulay has accepted his first fellowship in Military Hospital Pune and then later he got accepted for a fellowship in U.K., Liverpool to train in the pediatric cardiac surgery at the Royal Liverpool Children's Hospital. He came back to India to serve the country and with his idea to make cardiac surgery affordable and subsidized he went to Prince Aly Khan Hospital and set up a center, where he continued for 10 years.

In the year 2013, he was appointed as the Chief Cardiac Surgeon in Wockhardt Hospital and continued there till 2016. He was the director of cardiothoracic and vascular surgery at Global Hospital Parel, Mumbai. Currently, he is the director of Masina Heart Institute of Masina Hospital, Byculla, Mumbai.

References

Living people
Shivaji University alumni
1970 births
Indian cardiac surgeons
Alumni of the University of Manchester
Medical doctors from Mumbai